Henry Crook (1802 – 17 August 1886) was an English first-class cricketer, active 1827–1837, who played for Nottingham Cricket Club.

References

1802 births
1886 deaths
English cricketers
English cricketers of 1826 to 1863
Nottingham Cricket Club cricketers